P124 may refer to:
 Papyrus 124
 , a patrol boat of the Turkish Navy
 P124, a state regional road in Latvia